Bramley RLFC was a rugby league club from the Bramley area of Leeds in West Yorkshire, England, that folded following the 1999 season. The club is a famous name in rugby league, having existed before the formation of the Northern Union in 1895. The traditional nickname for the club was 'the Villagers'.

Bramley Rugby League Community Club aka Bramley Buffaloes was formed by the fans of the former club with the desire to return to the professional ranks as quickly as possible, continuing the Bramley name, traditions and history.  However, The RFL denied the Buffaloes applications twice while admitting other clubs. The second bid was unsuccessful after The RFL changed the application process after the submission date. The new 'phoenix club' was admitted to National League Three in 2004.

A Junior club with the Bramley R.L. name was founded in 2015. Running From the Bramley Villagers Social Club, and playing on Pollard Lane, Bramley.

History

Early history
Bramley was founded in 1879. They played at Whitegate Farm and Pollard Lane from their founding and moving to the Barley Mow ground in 1890.

The city of Leeds had an abundance of rugby football clubs and although members of the Yorkshire RFU (which was in turn a Constituent Body of the RFU), it was decided to form a ‘more local’ association. It was for this reason that the Leeds & District organisation was formalised when a meeting took place at the Green Dragon Hotel, Leeds on 27 September 1888. The foundation clubs were Bramley, Holbeck, Hunslet, Kirkstall, Leeds Parish Church, Leeds St John’s (later to become Leeds) and Wortley.

Bramley’s England international Harry Bradshaw, was the first test case at Twickenham, over "broken time payments" in 1893, two years before the "great schism" of 1895 that resulted in the formation of the Northern Union which in time would be renamed as the Rugby League. Bramley was admitted to the new Northern Union on 2 June 1896. The rugby league was then split into two county leagues, Lancashire and Yorkshire.

James Lomas became rugby league's first £100 transfer from Bramley to Salford in 1901.

On 9 October 1907, they became the first club to entertain a touring side when they played the New Zealand All Golds.

On 9 November 1921, the Australian Kangaroos as part of the 1921-22 Kangaroo tour, defeated Bramley 92-7 at Barley Mow. This would remain the highest ever score for an Australian team during a Kangaroo Tour.

In 1942-43, Bramley dropped out of the wartime Yorkshire League, they did not return to league competition until 1945-46.

Post-war
In the 1960s, the club moved to a new ground on land adjacent to Barley Mow, which became known as McLaren Field. Bramley developed the ground into a more modern stadium in 1966 with the hope that the new ground would help to take them up the leagues.
 
In 1973, the clubs voted to split into two divisions. Arthur Keegan became first team coach. Bramley defeated Wakefield Trinity, Castleford and St. Helens in order to reach the 1973 BBC2 Floodlit Trophy. They won the trophy with a 15–7 away victory over Widnes on 14 December 1973. It was the first cup Bramley had won in their entire history. Ironically, due to power cuts resulting from the Three-Day Week, the final against Widnes at Naughton Park took place on a mid-week afternoon. The club played in the First Division in that 1973-74 season. Though relegated the club had some excellent league wins including an away victory at Headingley against Leeds. The loss of fixtures against Leeds, Wakefield Trinity and Bradford Northern cost the club financially.

On 1 September 1974, Bramley defeated Doncaster 52–17 at McLaren Field in a Yorkshire County Cup, first round tie, this broke the club record which had stood since 1946. The resources of the Villagers could not sustain this success, results and attendances flagged, and Keegan was sacked in September 1976.

Bramley won promotion to Division One, under Peter Fox, in the 1976-77 season.

Bramley almost went into liquidation in October 1983 but survived.

In 1990, the club was faced with an estimated bill of £250,000 to carry out comprehensive safety work at McLaren Field, for the start of the 1991–92 season. John Kear was appointed coach in 1992.

In January 1994, Bramley announced plans to leave McLaren Field and move in with Northern Premier League Association football club Farsley Celtic. In June 1994, they changed their minds and decided to stay at McLaren Field until the end of the 1994–95 season as Hunslet discussed playing games at McLaren Field instead of Elland Road. The following seasons they played at Clarence Field, Kirkstall, the home of Headingley rugby union club after the previous directors sold McLaren Field for housing and then moved to Headingley in 1997. Crowd numbers were affected, and the team became ever more overshadowed by Leeds. Leeds players such as Barrie McDermott and Leroy Rivett turned out for Bramley on the way back from injury.

In 1999, a possible merger between Hunslet and Bramley was debated. At the end of the 1999 season Bramley resigned from the Northern Ford Premiership to become a feeder team for Leeds, but this never materialised. Bramley applied to rejoin the Northern Ford Premiership in 2000 but was rejected while a similar bid from Gateshead Thunder was accepted. They had planned to play games at the home of soccer club Farsley Celtic and progressively upgrade the ground; this may have been the cause of the rejection. The club (Bramley RLFC (1984) Ltd) retained associate membership of The Rugby Football League for a while, and continues to exist as a dormant company.

Past coaches
Also see :Category:Bramley R.L.F.C. coaches.

 Ted Spillane 19??
 David Jenkins 1951-57
 Don Robinson 1964
 Keith Holliday 1966-68
 Arthur Keegan 1973–75
 Don Robinson 
 Peter Fox 1976–77
 Dave Stockwell 1978 -1979
 Keith Hepworth 1980-82
 Maurice Bamford 1982-83
 Peter Jarvis 1984-85
 Chris Forster 1985 
 Allan Agar 1986-87
 Tony Fisher 1988-89
 Barry Johnson 1990
 Roy Dickinson 1991
 John Kear 1992
 Maurice Bamford 1993
 Ray Ashton 1994-96
 Mike Ford 1999

Former players

Players earning international caps while at Bramley

 Harry Bradshaw won caps for England (RU) while at Bramley in 1892 against Scotland, in 1893 against Wales, Ireland, and Scotland, and in 1894 against Wales, Ireland, and Scotland
 T. Cheshire won a cap(s) for Other Nationalities while at Bramley
 C. Forster won a cap(s) for Other Nationalities while at Bramley
 Louis Marshall won a cap for England while at Bramley in 1923 against Wales
 Rom Pomering won a cap(s) for Other Nationalities while at Bramley
 Terence "Terry Robbins won a cap for Wales while at Bramley in 1963 against France
 W. Bobby Whiteley won a cap for England (RU) while at Bramley in 1896 against Wales

Other notable players

 Syd Abram captain 
 Peter Astbury 
 Mark Aston
 'Fiery' Jack Austin  1973–74 BBC2 Floodlit Trophy
  Robert "Bob" Bartlett  (to Leeds)
 Leslie Chamberlain
 Geoffrey "Geoff" Clarkson
 Terry Crook
 Paul Drake
 Steve Durham
 Paul Fletcher (Testimonial match 1990)
 Neil Fox
 James "Jim" Hainsworth
 Keith Holliday
 Terry Hollindrake
 Dave Horn 
 Graham Idle
 Arthur Keegan
 Peter Lister (Testimonial match 1990) try-scoring record 1985-86
 James "Jimmy" Lomas 1899…1901
 Charlie Mathers 1888 British Isles tourist (RU)
 Seamus McCallion
 Barrie McDermott
 Terry Newton
 David Sampson
 Garry Schofield
 Joseph "Joe" Sedgewick
 Stanley "Stan" Smith
 Jeffrey "Jeff" Tennant (Testimonial match 1987)
 Dennis Warrior (Testimonial match 1955)
 John "Johnny" Wilson
 Johnny Wolford
 Wayne (Danny) Thornton

Seasons

Summer era

Honours
BBC2 Floodlit Trophy: 1 (1973-74)

Records

Player records
Most tries in a match: 7 by Joe Sedgewick vs Normanton, 16 April 1906
Most tries in a season: 34 by Peter Lister, 1985–86 
Most career tries: 140 by Peter Lister, 1982–91 
Most career goals: 926 by Johnny Wilson, 1953–64
Most career points: 1903 by Johnny Wilson, 1953–64
Most career appearances: 410 by Johnny Wolford 1962–76 
Most consecutive appearances: 100 by Jim Hainsworth, April 1960 - December 1962

Club records 
Highest score against: 92-7 vs Australia, 9 November 1921 (Tour Match)
Highest attendance at Barley Mow: 12,600 vs Leeds, 7 May 1947
Highest attendance at McLaren Field: 7,500 vs Bradford Northern, 17 February 1972

References

External links
 Gateshead and Bramley sweat
 Bramley apply to rejoin RFL
 The All Golds
 Bramley Rugby League Football Club 1984 Ltd.

Sport in Leeds
Rugby clubs established in 1879
Defunct rugby league teams in England
Rugby league teams in West Yorkshire
Leeds Blue Plaques
English rugby league teams